Lind Ridge is a ridge forming the south wall of Coleman Glacier in the Ames Range of Marie Byrd Land, Antarctica. it was mapped by the United States Geological Survey from surveys and U.S. Navy air photos, 1959–65, and was named by the Advisory Committee on Antarctic Names for Larry W. Lind, a glaciologist at Byrd Station, 1968–69.

References

Ridges of Marie Byrd Land
Ames Range